The women's 1500 metres at the 2022 Commonwealth Games, as part of the athletics programme, took place in the Alexander Stadium on 5 and 7 August 2022.

Records
Prior to this competition, the existing world and Games records were as follows:

Schedule
The schedule was as follows:

All times are British Summer Time (UTC+1)

Results

First round
The first round consisted of two heats. The five fastest competitors per heat (plus four fastest losers) advanced to the final.

Final
The medals were determined in the final.

References

Women's 1500 metres
2022
2022 in women's athletics